Ludvig Fasting (1789–1863) was a Danish professor, administrator, soldier, and explorer who served as Inspector of North Greenland between 1828 and 1843.

During his 15-year tenure as Inspector of North Greenland he campaigned for economic and health development within the colony, and attempted to unify the Danes and the Greenlandic Inuit through the use of both Danish and Greenlandic in his dispatches. 

In 1843 he resigned due to poor health and returned to mainland Denmark.

His nephew was the esteemed painter Johannes Fasting Wilhjelm.

See also
 List of inspectors of Greenland

References 

1789 births
1863 deaths
Danish soldiers
Inspectors of Greenland
19th-century Danish people
History of the Arctic